Hunter was a former station on the Hunter Branch of the Ulster and Delaware Railroad (U&D) and was the busiest station on the branch lines of the U&D. Within several yards of the station were the Standard Oil Co. and the Otto Gordon Coal Co. The village of Hunter, which the station serviced, was also home to several popular resorts.

The station was built in 1882, and was the last station to be built by the narrow-gauge Stony Clove & Catskill Mountain Railroad. The U&D incorporated the smaller railroad in 1899. The station was expanded in 1900.

The U&D was taken over by the New York Central Railroad in 1932, and Hunter station was one of only two stations on the branch lines. However, the branch lines of the U&D were abandoned in 1939, and scrapped in 1940.

The station is now a private dwelling and the freight house is a tool shed.

Bibliography

References

Railway stations in the Catskill Mountains
Former Ulster and Delaware Railroad stations
Railway stations in Greene County, New York
Former railway stations in New York (state)
Railway stations closed in 1940
Railway stations in the United States opened in 1882
1882 establishments in New York (state)